This is a list of ambassadors of the United States to Chad.

9 Jan 1961 – 28 May 1961 W. Wendell Blancke (Resident at Republic of Congo)
Jan 1961 - May 1961 Frederic L. Chapin (Interim)
28 May 1961 – 1 Apr 1963 John A. Calhoun
12 Aug 1963 – 20 Jan 1967 Brewster H. Morris
23 Sep 1967 – 9 May 1969 Sheldon B. Vance
21 Aug 1969 – 29 Jun 1972 Terence A. Todman
6 Dec 1972 – 23 Jun 1974 Edward W. Mulcahy
7 Dec 1974 – 23 Feb 1976 Edward S. Little
15 Oct 1976 – 19 Jun 1979 William G. Bradford
17 Nov 1979 – 24 Mar 1980 Donald R. Norland (Embassy closed 24 Mar 1980)
15 Jan 1982 – 27 May 1983 John Blane (Reopened embassy 15 Jan 1982, as Principal Officer and Chargé d'Affaires ad interim)
27 May 1983 – 23 Jul 1985 Jay P. Moffat
2 Sep 1985 – 4 Oct 1988 John Blane
15 Oct 1988 – 15 Nov 1989 Robert L. Pugh
4 Aug 1990 – 21 Jul 1993 Richard Wayne Bogosian
3 Sep 1993 – 26  Jun 1996 Laurence Everett Pope II
12 Sep 1996 – 6 Aug 1999 David C. Halsted
10 Oct 1999 – 16 Jan 2004 Christopher E. Goldthwait
16 Jun 2004 – 7 Jul 2007  Marc M. Wall
16 Nov 2007 – Sep 2010 Louis J. Nigro, Jr.
10 Nov 2010 – 25 July 2013 Mark M. Boulware
6 Sep 2013 – 11 Aug 2016 James Knight
9 Sep 2016 – 20 Sep 2018 Geeta Pasi
 18 Aug 2022 - Present Alexander Laskaris

See also
Chad – United States relations
Foreign relations of Chad

References

United States Department of State: Background notes on Chad

External links
 United States Department of State: Chiefs of Mission for Chad
 United States Department of State: Chad
 United States Embassy in N'Djamena

Chad

United States